John Lathrop Throckmorton (February 28, 1913 – February 13, 1986) was a general in the United States Army

Early life
Throckmorton was born in Kansas City, Missouri, on February 28, 1913. After graduating from Culver Military Academy in 1931 he attended and graduated from the United States Military Academy on June 12, 1935, and was commissioned as a second lieutenant in the infantry.

Military career
In World War II, Throckmorton was assigned to the G3 Section, First Army in the European Theater from 1943 to 1946. After the war, he served in the TAC Department at West Point from 1946 to 1949. He took command of a battalion in the 5th Regimental Combat Team in Hawaii from 1949 to 1950 and later became the regimental combat team commander from 1950 to 1951 during the Korean War. After the war, he attended the National War College in 1954, and later became Commandant of Cadets at the United States Military Academy at West Point from 1956 to 1959.

Throckmorton served from 1959 to 1960 as Assistant Commanding General, 101st Airborne Division, followed by an assignment as Secretary General Staff, Office of the Chief of Staff Army from 1960 to 1962. He took command of the 82nd Airborne Division from 1962 to 1964, then deployed to Vietnam as Deputy Commander, Military Assistance Command, Vietnam, from 1964 to 1965. His service in Vietnam was followed by an assignment as Deputy Commander, Office of the Chief Army Reserve from 1965 to 1966.

Throckmorton also served a tour of duty in 1967, commanding Task Force Detroit during the Detroit riots.

Throckmorton held successive commands as Commanding General, XVIII Airborne Corps (1967); Commanding General, Third United States Army, (1967–1969); and Commander in Chief, United States Strike Command, (1969–1973).

Throckmorton retired in Fayetteville, North Carolina, in 1973. He died on February 13, 1986, and was buried at Arlington National Cemetery next to his wife, Regina Theresa Higgins, whom he married on October 16, 1937. The library at Fort Bragg is named in his honor.

References

1913 births
1986 deaths
United States Army generals
United States Military Academy alumni
Commandants of the Corps of Cadets of the United States Military Academy
United States Army personnel of World War II
United States Army personnel of the Korean War
United States Army personnel of the Vietnam War
Recipients of the Distinguished Service Cross (United States)
Recipients of the Distinguished Service Medal (US Army)
Recipients of the Silver Star
Recipients of the Legion of Merit
Recipients of the Air Medal
Recipients of the National Order of Vietnam
Recipients of the Gallantry Cross (Vietnam)
People from Kansas City, Missouri
Burials at Arlington National Cemetery
Culver Academies alumni